Petar Škundrić (born February 21, 1947) is a Serbian politician. He is a member of the Socialist Party of Serbia who served as the Minister of Energy and Mining from 2008 to 2011.

Education and career
Škundrić graduated and obtained his masters and PhD degrees at the Faculty of Technology and Metallurgy of the University of Belgrade.

He is professor at the Faculty of Technology and Metallurgy in Belgrade, and honorary professor at the Saint Petersburg State Institute of Technology.

He is one of the founding members and first secretary general of the Socialist Party of Serbia, and was a member of parliament of the former state union of Serbia and Montenegro. Presently he is a member of the board of SPS.

On July 7, 2008 he was elected Minister of Energy and Mining in the Government of Serbia, a post he held until March 2011, when the portfolio was split into the Infrastructure and Environment ministries.

He was kicked out from the Socialist Party of Serbia after his son arrested at an anti-government protest in July 2019. President of Serbia, Aleksandar Vučić called him a tycoon.

Škundrić is married and father of two sons.

References

External links

1947 births
Living people
People from Gračac
Serbs of Croatia
Government ministers of Serbia
Socialist Party of Serbia politicians
University of Belgrade alumni